CHLC may refer to:

 CHLC-FM, a radio station (97.1 FM) licensed to Baie-Comeau, Quebec, Canada
 Cooperative Human Linkage Center
 Certified Holistic Life Coach